Vaudeville is a 2010 album by Canadian rapper D-Sisive. The first single from the album was '"Ray Charles (Looking For a Star)". The album sees D-Sisive experiment with a broader range of styles, including pop influences such as those seen on the single "I Love a Girl".

Track listing
 Vaudeville (Friends Forever)
 The Riot Song
 Shotgun Wedding
 Just An Ostrich
 Ray Charles (Looking For A Star) (with King Reign)
 The Night My Baby Died (with Muneshine)
 Percocet
 Never Knew Me
 Liberace (with Ron Sexsmith)
 Scaredy Cat
 Wichita
 I Love A Girl
 Aeroplane
 Bonus Track: West Coast
 Bonus Track: West Coast (Remix with Moka Only)

References

2010 albums
D-Sisive albums